The 48th Walker Cup Match was held May 8–9, 2021, in the United States at Seminole Golf Club in Juno Beach, Florida. It was the first time the Walker Cup was played in Florida. The United States won by 14 points to 12.

Format
On Saturday, were four matches of foursomes in the morning and eight singles matches in the afternoon. On Sunday, there were again four matches of foursomes in the morning, followed by ten singles matches (involving every player) in the afternoon. In all, 26 matches were played.

Each of the 26 matches was worth one point in the larger team competition. If a match was all square after the 18th hole extra holes are not played. Rather, each side earned ½ a point toward their team total. The team that accumulated at least 13½ points won the competition. In the event of a tie, the previous winner retained the Cup.

Teams

U.S. team
Tyler Strafaci was the first player to qualify for the team, by winning the 2020 U.S. Amateur. Ricky Castillo, John Pak and Davis Thompson were the next players to make the team, as the top three Americans in the World Amateur Golf Ranking as on February 10, 2021. The remaining members of the team were announced on March 1, 2021. Two alternates for the team were also announced: Mac Meissner and Garett Reband. Reband later decided not travel to the venue and was replaced as the second alternate by Cooper Dossey.

Great Britain and Ireland team
The Great Britain and Ireland team was announced on March 30, 2021. Joe Long gained automatic selection by winning the 2020 Amateur Championship. Two more players were automatic selections as the leading two in the World Amateur Golf Ranking: Sandy Scott and Alex Fitzpatrick. The travelling reserves were Jack Dyer and Jake Bolton. Scott later withdrew because of a wrist injury and was replaced by Dyer, Joe Pagdin being added as the second reserve.

Note: "Rank" is the World Amateur Golf Ranking as of the start of the Cup.

Saturday's matches
A number of players from both teams were affected by gastrointestinal illness. As a result the rules were changed so that if players were unable to compete, the captains could use the two alternates/reserves that were present at the venue. The original players were used in later matches when they became healthy.

Morning foursomes
Mac Meissner, the first American alternate, and Jake Bolton, the first reserve for the Great Britain and Ireland team were used in the morning foursomes.

Afternoon singles

Sunday's matches

Morning foursomes

Afternoon singles

References

External links

R&A site 
Golf Bible Walker Cup coverage

Walker Cup
Golf in Florida
Sports competitions in Florida
Walker Cup
Walker Cup
Walker Cup